Wilbur Kirkland also known as Willie Kirkland, (born 1947) is an American former professional basketball player. After a college career at Cheyney University of Pennsylvania, Kirkland played in two games for the Pittsburgh Pipers in the American Basketball Association. He was then drafted into the United States Army and, after serving for 18 months in the armed forces, he returned to basketball. Kirkland spent the next eight years playing for teams in Greece, Italy, and Switzerland, retiring from professional basketball in 1978.

Wilbur is also the older brother of Thaddeus Kirkland, a Democratic member of the Pennsylvania House of Representatives.

References

1947 births
Living people
American expatriate basketball people in Greece
American expatriate basketball people in Italy
American expatriate basketball people in Switzerland
American men's basketball players
Basketball players from Pennsylvania
Chester High School alumni
Cheyney Wolves men's basketball players
Forwards (basketball)
Pittsburgh Pipers draft picks
Pittsburgh Pipers players
Sportspeople from Chester, Pennsylvania